Bielsa is a municipality located in the province of Huesca, Aragon, Spain. According to the 2004 census (INE), the municipality has a population of 463 inhabitants.

The Bielsa tunnel under the Pyrenean mountains connects Bielsa and Aragnouet in France. It was first opened in 1970. In 2002, the French government unilaterally decided to close the tunnel to heavy-goods vehicles over 3.5 tonnes, a decision which caused serious concern in Aragon.

References

External links

Bielsa on Diputación de Huesca

Municipalities in the Province of Huesca
France–Spain border crossings